Jeanne-Nicole Ngo Minyemeck (born 18 August 1969) is a Cameroonian athlete. She competed in the women's shot put and the women's discus throw at the 1988 Summer Olympics.

References

1969 births
Living people
Athletes (track and field) at the 1988 Summer Olympics
Cameroonian female shot putters
Cameroonian female discus throwers
Olympic athletes of Cameroon
Place of birth missing (living people)
African Games medalists in athletics (track and field)
African Games gold medalists for Cameroon
Athletes (track and field) at the 1987 All-Africa Games